Photocure ASA is a Norwegian specialty pharma company that develops and sells pharmaceuticals and medical devices based on proprietary photodynamic technology. Photocure's strategy in cancer is to continue the commercialization of Hexvix for bladder cancer diagnostics, and continue the development of the cancer portfolio and out-license prior to phase III studies. This strategy is based on a strong platform of intellectual property in photodynamic therapy.

Pharmaceuticals
Hexyl aminolevulinate hydrochloride for diagnosis of bladder cancer.

References

External links

Companies established in 1993
Pharmaceutical companies of Norway
Companies listed on the Oslo Stock Exchange